Fashion Theory: The Journal of Dress, Body & Culture is a peer-reviewed academic journal published by Routledge. It was established in 1997 and covers the study of fashion, including aspects from sociology, art history, consumption studies, and anthropology. In the first editorial, the founding editor-in-chief Valerie Steele (The Museum at the Fashion Institute of Technology) stated that the journal approaches fashion "as the cultural construction of the embodied identity". The journal investigates issues of body in society but also includes studies on practices of production, dissemination, and consumption of dress. In addition, it includes reviews of exhibitions and academic publications.

References

External links

Fashion Theory

Arts journals
Publications established in 1997
English-language journals
Routledge academic journals
5 times per year journals